Liverpool Town Council existed from 1835 to 1880.

Liverpool Town Council was established by the Municipal Corporations Act 1835, replacing the Liverpool Common Council which was first established under the Charter of King John in 1207. Records for the Common Council go back to 1550. In 1835, Sixteen wards were established, each of which elected three councillors for a three-year term. One-third of the councillors were elected each year in a three-year cycle. The councillors were elected by male ratepayers (not all adults). The franchise was extended throughout the 19th and early 20th centuries.  In addition there were 16  aldermen who were elected by the council and had the same voting rights as the elected councillors.

The Municipal Year ran from the date of the Council Annual General Meeting, (9 November, unless this was a Sunday, in which case the AGM was held on Monday 10 November) until 8 (or 9) November the following year.

The increase in the numbers of electors is due to the increasing population and the widening of the franchise.

Liverpool Town Council became Liverpool City Council when Liverpool was awarded City Status on 12 May 1880.

Council elections
1835 - First elections to the Council. Reformers win overwhelming victory
1836
1837
1838 - Aldermanic elections
1839
1840
1841 - Conservatives take control, Aldermanic elections
1842
1843
1844
1845
1846
1847
1848
1849
1850
1851
1852
1853
1854
1855
1856
1857
1858
1859 Liberal Party founded
1860
1861
1862
1863
1864
1865
1866
1867
1868
1869
1870
1871
1872
1873
1874
1875
1876
1877
1878
1879

Polling Arrangements

The franchise was based on rates paid, some electors had several votes depending on the number of properties for which they paid rates (residence and business premises).

Polling took place on the first of November, except when this fell on a Sunday, in which case it was moved to Monday, the second of November. This continued from 1835 to 1948, when the Representation of the People Act 1948 changed election day to the first Thursday in May.

An Alderman was appointed by the Council as the Returning officer for each of the wards and two assessors.

Polling began at 9 a.m. and ran until 4 p.m., but the Preciding Officers had the power to close the poll at any time before four o'clock, if an hour had elapsed during which no votes were cast. Even when a candidate was unopposed, the polls were opened. Usually a very small number of votes were cast and the polling was closed early.

Treating was common until it was criminalised by the Corrupt and Illegal Practices Prevention Act 1883.

There was usually one polling place in each ward. Locations used included private houses, shops, coffee houses and even public houses!

Declaration on taking Office

Section 50 of the Municipal Corporations Act 1835 required that a Councillor, on taking office, make the following declaration "be made and subscribed before any two Aldermen or Councillors."

Aldermanic Elections

There were sixteen aldermen elected by the Town Council.  In 1835 (the year of establishment of the elected Town Council) all sixteen were elected, eight for a term of three years and eight for a term of six years.  Thereafter, eight were elected every third year for a term of six years.

The Aldermanic election was held at the first Council meeting after the annual election of Councillors on 9 November, except when this was a Sunday, in which case it was moved to Monday 10 November.

The election process was for "each member of the Council delivering to the Mayor a piece of paper containing the names, professions and, residences of the parties for whom he votes."

If an alderman resigned, he was fined £50, although as a result of the Bye-law of 9 November 1885 this was reduced to one shilling (5 pence in decimal currency).

Relevant legislation

 Municipal Corporations Act 1835 replaced Common Councils with directly elected Borough Councils.
 Public Health Act 1848 created the local boards of health.
 Vestries Act 1850 
 Municipal Corporations Act 1859
 Representation of the People Act 1867 Doubled the number of voters by enfranchising all male heads of households who paid Rates personally.
 Municipal Franchise Act 1869 enfranchised women ratepayers.
 Local Government Board Act 1871 created the Local Government Board and abolished the Poor Law Board. 
 Ballot Act 1872 replaced voting in public with the Secret ballot.
 Municipal Elections Act 1875
 Elections (Hours of Poll) Act 1885

See also

 Liverpool
 Liverpool City Council
 Liverpool City Council elections 1880–present
 Liverpool School Board elections 1870–1900
 Directly elected mayor of Liverpool - 2012–present
 Merseyside County Council 1974–1986
 Mayors and Lord Mayors of Liverpool 1207 to present
 West Derby Hundred
 History of local government in England
 Timeline of Liverpool

References

External links
Liverpool City Council

 
Elections in Liverpool